Eight teams qualified for the women's ice hockey tournament at the 2010 Winter Olympics. The top six teams in the IIHF World Ranking after the 2008 Women's World Ice Hockey Championships received automatic berths into the Ice Hockey event. Lower ranked teams had an opportunity to qualify for the event. Teams ranked 13th and below were divided into two groups where they played in a first qualification round in September 2008. The two group winners from the round advanced to the second qualification round, where the teams ranked 7th through 12th joined them. In the second qualifying round, played in November 2008, the teams were again divided into two groups. The two group winners China and Slovakia advanced to the Olympic Ice Hockey Tournament.

Qualified teams

Notes

IIHF World Ranking

Pre-qualification tournaments
The following teams were ranked 13th and below in the IIHF World Ranking.  They were seeded according to their ranking, with the two group winners advancing to the final qualification tournaments.

Group A
Games were played in Liepāja, Latvia.

All times are local (UTC+1).

Group B
Games were played in Maribor, Slovenia.

All times are local (UTC+2).

Final Qualification Tournaments
By being ranked 7 through 12 in the final 2008 IIHF World Rankings, the following teams qualified for the qualification tournament.  There were two winners from these tournaments that advanced to the Olympic tournament.

Group C
Games were played in Bad Tölz, Germany.

All times are local (UTC+1).

Group D
Games were played in Shanghai, China.

All times are local (UTC+8).

References

Official Qualification site

qualification
Qualification for the 2010 Winter Olympics
Olympics

nl:IJshockey op de Olympische Winterspelen 2010/kwalificatie#Kwalificatie vrouwen